The 2016 Aegon Championships, also known as the Queen's Club Championships, was a men's tennis tournament played on outdoor grass courts. It was the 114th edition of those championships and part of the ATP World Tour 500 series of the 2016 ATP World Tour. It took place at the Queen's Club in London, United Kingdom from 13 June until 19 June 2016. First-seeded Andy Murray won the singles tour.

Points and prize money

Point distribution

Prize money 

*per team

Singles main draw entrants

Seeds

 Rankings are as of June 6, 2016.

Other entrants
The following players received wildcards into the singles main draw:
  Kyle Edmund
  Daniel Evans
  James Ward

The following players using a protected ranking into the singles main draw:
  Juan Martín del Potro
  Janko Tipsarević

The following players received entry from the qualifying draw:
  Kevin Anderson
  Adrian Mannarino
  Vasek Pospisil
  Donald Young

The following player received entry as a lucky loser:
  Jiří Veselý

Withdrawals
Before the tournament
  Alexandr Dolgopolov →replaced by  Jiří Veselý
  Leonardo Mayer →replaced by  Fernando Verdasco
  Rafael Nadal (left wrist injury) →replaced by  Aljaž Bedene
  Jo-Wilfried Tsonga →replaced by  Paul-Henri Mathieu

During the tournament
  Paul-Henri Mathieu

Doubles main draw entrants

Seeds

 Rankings are as of June 6, 2016.

Other entrants
The following pairs received wildcards into the doubles main draw:
  Aljaž Bedene /  Kyle Edmund 
  Jonathan Erlich /  Colin Fleming

The following pair received entry from the qualifying draw:
  Chris Guccione /  André Sá

The following pair received entry as lucky losers:
  Steve Johnson /  Nicholas Monroe

Finals

Singles

  Andy Murray defeated  Milos Raonic, 6–7(5–7), 6–4, 6–3

Doubles

  Pierre-Hugues Herbert /  Nicolas Mahut defeated  Chris Guccione /  André Sá, 6–3, 7–6(7–5)

References

External links
 Official website
 ATP tournament profile

Queen's Club Championships
Queen's Club Championships
Queen's Club Championships
June 2016 sports events in the United Kingdom
Queen's Club Championships